A wide receiver is a position in American football.

it may also refer to:
Wide Receiver (album), an album by Michael Henderson
Wide Receiver (song)
ATF gunwalking scandal, code named Operation Wide Receiver, a U.S sting operation